Yunhi (transl. Just So) is a Pakistani television series, directed by Mohammed Ehteshamuddin, written by Sarwat Nazir, and produced by Momina Duraid under banner MD Productions. It features Maya Ali and Bilal Ashraf in leading roles. The first episode of the series aired on Hum TV on 5 February 2023.

Cast 

 Maya Ali as Kaneez Fatima aka 'Kim'
 Bilal Ashraf as Dawood
 Maha Hasan as Suriya
 Khaqan Shahnawaz as Daniyal
 Deepak Parwani as Dr. Naveed
 Manzoor Qureshi as Haji Karamat
 Tahira Imam as Razia
 Behroze Sabzwari as Basharat
 Laiba Khurram as Husna
 Tazeen Hissain as Iqbal

Soundtrack 
The original soundtrack was composed by Sami Khan, and sung by Sami Khan and Shae Gill (of Pasoori fame).

Production 
On 28 August 2022, Hum TV announced that network's upcoming series Yunhi will star Bilal Ashraf in his television series debut, opposite Maya Ali who will return to channel after six years,  since Sanam (2016).

References 

Pakistani television series
Hum TV original programming
2023 Pakistani television series debuts
2023 Pakistani television series endings